Garibaldi Alves (27 May 1923 – 7 April 2022) was a Brazilian politician. He represented Rio Grande do Norte in the Federal Senate from 2011 to 2014. Previously, he was vice-governor of Rio Grande do Norte from 1987 to 1991. He was a member of the Brazilian Democratic Movement Party.

References

1923 births
2022 deaths
Members of the Federal Senate (Brazil)
Members of the Legislative Assembly of Rio Grande do Norte
Rio Grande do Norte politicians
Brazilian Democratic Movement politicians
Brazilian farmers